Chikoo Aur Bunty is an Indian animated television series, produced by Hitech Studio, which airs on Nickelodeon. The series premiered on 18 October 2021.

The show typically follows a format of two 11-13 minute-long independent segments per episode. The series showcases the story of two siblings named Chikoo and Bunty, who compete for affection and goodies while avoiding being reprimanded by their parents. The lyrics of the show's title song was written by poet and lyricist Gulzar.

Episodes

Season 1

Movies

Synopsis 
It is a comedy series focused on the relationship between siblings. It revolves around the rivalry between two brothers Chikoo and Bunty, competing for affection, goodies, and often escaping the parents' attention, mainly when they create mayhem at home, neighbourhood, school, or playground.

Cast 
 Khushboo Atre as Bunty Batra
 Mahendra Bhatnagar as Naanaji
 Rupa Bhimani as Naani
 Anita Dokania as Daadi (Mrs. Batra)
 Shaily Dubey as Chikoo Batra
 Meghna Erande Joshi as Megha Batra, Chikoo and Bunty's mom
 Shanoor Mirza as Rajeev Batra, Chikoo and Bunty's dad
 Manoj Pandey as Daadaji (Mr. Batra)

Characters 
 Chikoo Batra: He is an 11-year-old boy who is the elder sibling of Bunty. He is calm and relaxed, optimistic, friendly, reliable, witty, fun-loving and a quick thinker. He has the answers to all of life’s problems. The only problem is that nobody agrees with him and his approach. He is the ultimate shortcut master. He loves cricket and aspires to become a cricketer but doesn’t want to work too hard. He loves to bat but feigns injuries when he must field. And often, he even manages to get away with it. He considers Virat Kohli as his idol. He want new bats on regular basis and he loves Virat Kohli's autograph bat. He always says these dialogue when he fights with Bunty, 'Ustado se ustadi, padti hai bhari' and 'Bunty abhi bajata hu teri ghanti !'. His best friends are Vicky and Sonu. His best friends also loves to play and watch cricket.
 Bunty Batra: He is the 10-year-old younger brother of Chikoo. He is a cheerful ball of energy, crafty, attention-seeking, provocative, sarcastic, outgoing, quick learner, fast on his feet, has an entrepreneurial spirit and is a jack of all trades. He tends to get carried away when he is in the zone and makes amends that may not be needed in the first place. But his failures do not discourage him one bit. He thinks that one day he will invent such a product that he will never have to study again to find a job. He is an expert in fixing things and also loves dancing and considers Michael Jackson and Tiger Shroff as his idol. He always says these dialogue when he fights with Chikoo, 'Age mein chotta hu, akal mein nahi' and 'Chikoo, abhi banata hu tera Chikoo Milkshake !'. His best friend is Twinkle. Her best friend also loves to dance.
Rajeev Batra: Chikoo and Bunty's dad. He is a rational, perpetually tired, noninterfering, practical, naïve and humble father. His life's mantra is, everything will work out just fine, on its own. He likes anything and everything that can help him relax – reading, meditating, singing, walks, listening to music and dislikes having to punish the boys, his me time getting interrupted, quarrelling with his wife. When he is fed up Chikoo and Bunty's fight he says this dialogue, 'Ek east hai to ek west hai, in dono ke bich mein meri patience ki test hai'.
 Megha Batra: Chikoo and Bunty's mom. She is loving, anxious, borderline obsessive, sensible and straightforward. She is constantly finding ways to motivate her boys to do well in life. She is not as easy to fool as the father. She tries hard to run the house and have everything under control. She loves her pet dog Barfi. When she is fed up Chikoo and Bunty's fight she says this dialogue, 'Ek east hai to ek west hai, in dono ke bich mein meri patience ki test hai'.
 Barfi Batra: He is the family's pet dog, who is playful, intelligent and quick-learner. Barfi is not even remotely as ferocious as he looks. He loves to eat bread and butter.
 Dada (Mr. Batra): He is a disciplinarian who believes in living by a schedule. Early to bed and early to rise is what he'd love to get the boys to follow. He wakes up every morning at 5 AM for a walk. He is pretty active for his age. He often taunts his son about how he failed to discipline his boys.
 Dadi (Mrs. Batra): She is quite the opposite of Dada. She supports the boys' extracurricular activities and believes there are alternate career paths that can be successful. She is okay that both boys are not studious but want to become cricketers and dancers, respectively. She is socially active and has a large friend circle. She always says this dialogue, 'Tumhari dadi nhi hai old school, hamesha rehti hai cool'.

See also 
 List of programmes broadcast by Nickelodeon (India)
 List of Indian animated television series

References

External links 
 Official website
 

2021 Indian television series debuts
Animated television series about children
Indian children's animated comedy television series
Indian computer-animation
Nickelodeon (Indian TV channel) original programming
Hindi-language Nickelodeon original programming